Experience the Magic is a live performance album by Borbetomagus, released in 1993 by Agaric Records.

Track listing

Personnel 
Adapted from Experience the Magic liner notes.

Borbetomagus
 Don Dietrich – accordion
 Donald Miller – harp
 Jim Sauter – glass harmonica, design

Production and additional personnel
 Paul Laliberté – cover art
 Gary Solomon – additional engineering

Release history

References

External links 
 Experience the Magic at Discogs (list of releases)

1993 live albums
Borbetomagus albums